N. Ch. Joseph was the President of the Protestant Andhra Evangelical Lutheran Church Society.

Although Joseph's period was short-lived, he undertook the mantle of the President to instill confidence in the ecclesiastical community.

N. Ch. Joseph belonged to the senior clergy of the Andhra Evangelical Lutheran Church Society.  The Madras Journal of Cooperation lists out his name as early as 1946 itself.

References

Further reading
 
 
 
 
 
 
 

20th-century Indian Lutheran clergy
Indian Christian theologians
Telugu people
Christian clergy from Andhra Pradesh
20th-century Indian translators
Senate of Serampore College (University) alumni
21st-century Indian Lutheran clergy